Zoltan Vamoș (27 January 1936 – 2001) was a Romanian middle-distance runner. He competed in the men's 1500 metres at the 1960 Summer Olympics.

References

External links

1936 births
2001 deaths
Athletes (track and field) at the 1960 Summer Olympics
Romanian male middle-distance runners
Olympic athletes of Romania
Universiade silver medalists for Romania
Universiade medalists in athletics (track and field)
Medalists at the 1961 Summer Universiade